Jelena Milivojčević (born 2 September 1990) is a Serbian karateka. She is a gold medalist at the Mediterranean Games and a two-time bronze medalist at the European Karate Championships.

In 2018, she won the gold medal in the women's kumite 50 kg event at the 2018 Mediterranean Games held in Tarragona, Spain. In 2019, she won one of the bronze medals in the women's kumite 50 kg event at the 2019 European Karate Championships held in Guadalajara, Spain.

In 2021, she competed at the World Olympic Qualification Tournament held in Paris, France hoping to qualify for the 2020 Summer Olympics in Tokyo, Japan.

References 

Living people
1990 births
Place of birth missing (living people)
Serbian female karateka
Competitors at the 2018 Mediterranean Games
Mediterranean Games gold medalists for Serbia
Mediterranean Games medalists in karate
Karateka at the 2019 European Games
European Games competitors for Serbia
21st-century Serbian women